Francesco Zanoncelli (born September 11, 1967 in Milan) is an Italian professional football coach and a former player.

He played for two seasons in the Serie A for A.C. Milan, Atalanta B.C. and one season in Serie B for Cagliari Calcio. In total he played 56 games and had 52 starts.

Now a coach at Kelvin Grove State College and as well as the Brisbane Roar FC in the A league Men, he also coaches at Ambrose Treacy College.

1967 births
Living people
Italian footballers
Italy under-21 international footballers
Serie A players
Serie B players
Serie C players
A.C. Milan players
Empoli F.C. players
A.C. Monza players
Atalanta B.C. players
Brescia Calcio players
Calcio Padova players
Ascoli Calcio 1898 F.C. players
U.S. Lecce players
Cagliari Calcio players
Genoa C.F.C. players
F.C. Crotone players
S.P.A.L. players
Italian football managers
Expatriate soccer managers in Australia
Association football defenders